The Soul Cages is the third full-length studio album released by English musician Sting. Released on 21 January 1991 it became Sting's second No. 1 album in the United Kingdom. This was Sting's first album to feature guitarist Dominic Miller, who would become a regular collaborator.

It spawned four singles: "All This Time", "Mad About You", "The Soul Cages", and "Why Should I Cry for You?". Both "All This Time" and "Why Should I Cry for You?" were included on Sting’s 1994 compilation album Fields of Gold: The Best of Sting 1984–1994. The title track won the first Grammy Award for Best Rock Song in 1992.

Since 2009, the song "Saint Agnes and the Burning Train" has been used as the character theme song for Running Mans Lee Kwang-soo.

On 15 January 2021, Sting released an expanded version of The Soul Cages to celebrate its 30th anniversary. Along with the original 9 tracks, this new edition includes 13 bonus tracks that consist of remixes, extended mixes, and a pair of songs sung in Spanish and Italian incarnations.

Concept
The Soul Cages is a concept album focused on the death of Sting's father. Sting had developed a writer's block shortly after his father's death in 1987; the episode lasted several years, until he was able to overcome his affliction by dealing with the death of his father through music. The single, "Why Should I Cry for You", was written for The Soul Cages in 1989, and Sting has said that the rest of the album flowed quite easily after that first hurdle was overcome. Most of the songs have motifs related to sailing or the seas; Sting wrote in his autobiography, Broken Music, that his father had always regretted not becoming a sailor. There are also references to Newcastle, the part of England where Sting grew up.

In an interview with Charlie Rose aired on 10 December 2010, Sting mentioned that he was working on a "mood piece", a musical project and book in collaboration with Pulitzer winner Brian Yorkey. The work would be based on an album he released many years ago concerning the loss of his father, growing up in Newcastle and witnessing the passing of the shipbuilding industry there. He admitted being scared of the prospect of pulling it all together but expressed confidence in it working out. This project has since been confirmed as the musical The Last Ship.

Packaging
At the time this album appeared, the music industry was starting to shift away from using CD longboxes. Sting, a committed environmentalist, wanted to eliminate the amount of cardboard waste caused by the longbox. The original packaging was a fourfold cardboard case that could be modified to look like a longbox, and folded back into a jewel box sized CD package for home storage. In Germany, the CD was sold in jewel cases as well as longboxes. The cover painting was a commissioned work by the Scottish artist Steven Campbell.

Until the release of Symphonicities in July 2010, The Soul Cages was the only studio album by Sting not to feature a photograph of himself on the front cover, although he does appear on the back cover of both albums.

Track listing

All songs written by Sting, except "Jeremiah Blues (Part 1)" and "The Wild Wild Sea" written with Dominic Miller.

Side one

 "Island of Souls" – 6:41
 "All This Time" – 4:54
 "Mad About You" – 3:53
 "Jeremiah Blues (Part 1)" – 4:54
 "Why Should I Cry for You" – 4:46

Side two

 "Saint Agnes and the Burning Train" – 2:43
 "The Wild Wild Sea" – 6:41
 "The Soul Cages" – 5:51
 "When the Angels Fall" – 7:48

Personnel

Musicians 
 Sting – vocals, Synclavier, mandolin, bass, arrangements 
 Kenny Kirkland – keyboards
 David Sancious – keyboards
 Dominic Miller – guitars
 Manu Katché – drums
 Skip Burney – percussion 
 Ray Cooper – percussion 
 Munyungo Jackson – percussion 
 Vinx De'Jon Parrette – percussion 
 Bill Summers – percussion 
 Tony Vacca – percussion
 Branford Marsalis – saxophones
 Paola Paparelle – oboe
 Kathryn Tickell – Northumbrian smallpipes

Production 
 Produced by Sting and Hugh Padgham; QSound production assisted by Brian Cowieson and Scott Willing
 Recorded and mixed by Hugh Padgham; Assisted by Simon Osbourne, Yves Jaget, Bruce Keene, Al Stone, Brian Scheuble and Efren Herrera
 Technical assistant to Sting – Danny Quatrochi
 Mastered by Bob Ludwig 
 Mixed at The Town House (London, England) and A&M Studios (Hollywood, California)
 Mastered at Masterdisk (New York City, New York)
 Design – Richard Frankel and Len Peltier
 Front cover painting and inside illustrations by Steven Campbell
 Photographs of Sting by Guzman
 All songs published by Magnetic Publishing, Ltd/Blue Turtle Music

Singles 
"All This Time" (1991) – No. 5 US Hot 100, No. 1 US Mainstream Rock, No. 1 US Modern Rock, No. 9 US Adult Contemporary, No. 22 UK Singles Chart
"Mad About You" (1991) – No. 56 UK Singles Chart
"Why Should I Cry For You" (1991)
"The Soul Cages"  (1991) – No. 7 US Mainstream Rock, No. 9 US Modern Rock, No. 57 UK Singles Chart

Charts

Weekly charts

Year-end charts

Certifications and sales

References

Sting (musician) albums
1991 albums
Albums produced by Hugh Padgham
A&M Records albums
Grammy Award for Best Rock Song
Concept albums